John Henry Poelker (April 14, 1913 – February 9, 1990) was mayor of St. Louis from 1973 to 1977.  He was a Democrat.

John H. Poelker served 10 years as comptroller prior to his one term as Mayor. (He did not seek re-election.) He began his political career in 1953 when he became the city's youngest assessor, although later on as mayor, he oversaw the demolition of Pruitt Igoe. After his retirement, the city of St. Louis began recognizing leadership, extraordinary vision, and personal commitment in advancing the revitalization of downtown St. Louis by naming an award in his honor: The John H. Poelker Levee Stone Award. Two of his brothers, Carl and Gerard were Monsignors in the Catholic Church in St. Louis.
His parents were John G. and Anne Marie (Bongner) Poelker.

Poelker died on February 9, 1990, at the age of 76.

References

 St. Louis Public Library
 
 

Mayors of St. Louis
1913 births
1990 deaths
20th-century American politicians